The 1943 Watford by-election was held on 23 February 1943.  The by-election was held due to the elevation to the peerage of the incumbent Conservative MP, Dennis Herbert.  It was won by the Conservative candidate William Helmore.

References

1943 elections in the United Kingdom
1943 in England
20th century in Hertfordshire
Politics of Watford
By-elections to the Parliament of the United Kingdom in Hertfordshire constituencies
History of Watford